Loïc Badé (born 11 April 2000) is a French professional footballer who plays as a defender for La Liga club Sevilla, on loan from Ligue 1 club Rennes.

Club career
On 30 December 2016, Badé joined Le Havre from the youth academy of Paris FC. He made his professional debut with Le Havre in a 1–0 Ligue 2 win over Niort on 10 January 2020. He signed his first professional contract with Lens on 20 June 2020.

On 5 July 2021, Badé joined Rennes on five-year deal. He scored his first career goal on 4 November 2021 against Mura in the UEFA Europa Conference League.

On 1 September 2022, Badé joined Premier League side Nottingham Forest on a season-long loan, with the club holding an option to make the loan permanent.

International career 
Badé made his debut for the France U21 national team in a 1–1 draw against the Faroe Islands on 6 September 2021.

Career statistics

Personal life
Born in France, Badé is of Ivorian descent.

References

External links
 
 
 LFP Profile

2000 births
People from Sèvres
Living people
French footballers
Association football defenders
AC Boulogne-Billancourt players
Paris FC players
Le Havre AC players
RC Lens players
Stade Rennais F.C. players
Nottingham Forest F.C. players
Ligue 1 players
Ligue 2 players
Championnat National 2 players
Championnat National 3 players
France under-21 international footballers
French expatriate footballers
Expatriate footballers in England
French expatriate sportspeople in England
French sportspeople of Ivorian descent